Zavrelia is a genus of European non-biting midges in the subfamily Chironominae of the bloodworm family Chironomidae.

Species of the genus are small to minute chironomids, which are recorded from both continents of the northern hemisphere. All known larvae of Zavrelia construct small, straight transportable cases of sand, silt, detritus and sometimes diatoms that function as retreats until the mature pupa swims to the surface prior to its adult emergence.

Species
Z. aristata Torbjørn & Stur, 2009
Z. casasi Torbjørn & Stur, 2009
Z. clinovolsella Guo & Wang, 2004
Z. hudsoni Torbjørn & Stur, 2009
Z. pentatoma Kieffer & Bause in Bause, 1914
Z. sinica Torbjørn & Stur, 2009
Z. tusimatijea (Sasa & Suzuki, 1999)

References

Chironomidae
Diptera of Europe